Ottomar Sachse (born 15 April 1951) is an East German former boxer. He competed at the 1972 Summer Olympics and the 1976 Summer Olympics in the light-heavyweight category.

At the 1976 Summer Olympics, after a walkover against Louis Ngatchou of Cameroon, he defeated Joan Montane of Andorra before losing to Leon Spinks of the United States in the quarterfinals.

References

External links
 

1951 births
Living people
German male boxers
Olympic boxers of East Germany
Boxers at the 1972 Summer Olympics
Boxers at the 1976 Summer Olympics
People from Lützen
AIBA World Boxing Championships medalists
Light-heavyweight boxers
Sportspeople from Saxony-Anhalt